Mark Lindsey De Motte (December 28, 1832 – September 23, 1908) was an American lawyer, Civil War veteran, and politician who served one term as a U.S. Representative from Indiana from 1881 to 1883. He was also a lawyer, law school dean, newspaper editor and postmaster. The town of DeMotte, Indiana was named after him during his term in Congress.

Biography
Born in Rockville, Indiana, De Motte pursued preparatory studies.
He was graduated from the literary department of Indiana Asbury (now De Pauw) University, Greencastle, Indiana, in 1853 and from the law department of the same university in 1855. He was admitted to the bar and began practice in Valparaiso in 1855. De Motte was elected prosecuting attorney of the sixty-seventh judicial district in 1856.

Civil War 
He served in the Union Army with the rank of first lieutenant in 1861. He was promoted to captain in 1862.

Career
At the close of the war he moved to Lexington, Missouri, and resumed the practice of law. He was editor and proprietor of the Lexington Register. He was an unsuccessful Republican candidate for election to Congress in 1872 and 1876. He served as delegate to the Republican National Convention in 1876. He returned to Valparaiso, Indiana, in 1877 and resumed the practice of law. He organized the Northern Indiana Law School (later Valparaiso University School of Law) in 1879.

Congress 
De Motte was elected as a Republican to the Forty-seventh Congress (March 4, 1881 – March 3, 1883). He was an unsuccessful candidate for reelection in 1882 to the Forty-eighth Congress.

Later career and death 
He served as member of the Indiana State Senate from 1886 to 1890. He was appointed postmaster of Valparaiso March 24, 1890, and served until March 20, 1894. He was dean of the Northern Indiana Law School from 1890 to 1908.

He died in Valparaiso, Indiana, September 23, 1908, and was interred in Maplewood Cemetery.

References
 Retrieved on 2009-05-13

External links

1832 births
1908 deaths
People from Valparaiso, Indiana
People of Indiana in the American Civil War
DePauw University alumni
Union Army officers
Republican Party Indiana state senators
American university and college faculty deans
People from Rockville, Indiana
19th-century American politicians
Deans of law schools in the United States
Indiana postmasters
Republican Party members of the United States House of Representatives from Indiana